A32 is the number for two roads in Australia:
 Barrier Highway, a highway in New South Wales and South Australia, Australia
 Great Western Highway, a highway in New South Wales, Australia (numbered A32 between Lapstone and Bathurst)